Kim Wonu (Hangul: 김원우) is a modern South Korean novelist.

Life
Kim Wonu was born on April 11, 1947, with sources unclear on Gimhae Gyeongsangnam-do or Jinju Gyeongsangnam-do, Korea. Kim attended Gyeongbuk University from which he received his B.A. in English and Sogang University from which he received and M.A. in Korean. He has been a member of the group "Jakga" since 1979 and served as Editor in Chief on Minumsa Publishing.

Work
Kim Wonu made his literary debut in 1977 with the novella Appointed Posts (Imji), a scathing critique of the philistinism and commodity fetishism that he saw as pervasive in middle-class Korean society. Everyday lives of middle-class Koreans in all its unabashed materialism and self-interest, is an abiding concern in the entire body of Kim Wonu's fiction. His characters possess little or no individual personality, and can only find meaning in their lives through the ceaseless pursuit of profit. Because they are so entrenched in immediate material gratification, they fail to realize the sterility of their lives; Kim Wonu, therefore, frequently employs an outside agent to act as a mediator in his fiction.

There is, however, a certain reflectiveness that pervades Kim Wonu's fiction, and this quality has much to do with the way in which Kim's own experiences are brought to bear in his fictional accounts. The falsity and hypocrisy that underlie middle-class rhetoric of success is part of his life as well; the sense of weariness generated by life's routines can be detected in Kim's reminiscences of his own youth. Kim Wonu's critical voice thus conveys something stubborn yet honest at the same time. Combined effectively with meticulous, insightful descriptions of ordinary people and events, this voice allows Kim Wonu's works to become something more than mere 'novel of manners' and offer intellectually engaging portraits of life that are at once fiercely critical and heart-warming.

Kim has won the 1998 Dong-sa Literature Award and  2002 Daesan Literature Prize.

Works in Translation
Chinese
 禽兽的日子 (짐승의 시간)

Works in Korean (Partial)
Story Collections
 Non-organic Youth (Mugijil cheongnyeon, 1981)
 Life Studies (Insaeng gongbu, 1983)
 Hour of the Beasts (Jimseungui sigan, 1986)
 Racing through the Obstacle Course (Jangaemul gyeongju, 1986)
 Your Winter (Gyeoul sogui neo)
 A Story of Three Sisters (Sejamae iyagi, 1988)
 Remote Days (Adeukhan nanal)
 Naked Heart (Beolgeobeoseun maeum)
 The Sea of Patriots (Ugugui bada, 1993)

Awards
 1991 Dong-in Literary Award
 1998 Dong-sa Literature Award
 2002 Daesan Literature Prize

References 

1974 births
Korean writers
Living people
Kyungpook National University alumni
Sogang University alumni